Iain Pyman (born 3 March 1973) is an English professional golfer.

Early life and amateur career
Pyman was born in Whitby. He won the Carris Trophy in 1991, and played in a winning Jacques Léglise Trophy team the same year. In 1993 he won The Amateur Championship by defeating Paul Page after 37 holes at Royal Portrush, and was the leading amateur in The Open Championship at Royal St George's. He played in the Walker Cup at the end of 1993.

Professional career
Pyman turned professional in 1994. His career has fluctuated between seasons on the main European Tour and seasons on the second tier Challenge Tour. He has won eight tournaments on the Challenge Tour, more than any other player, but has not won on the European Tour. He won the ECCO Tour Championship and the Telia Challenge Waxholm in back-to-back weeks on the Challenge Tour in 2007.

Amateur wins
1991 Carris Trophy
1993 The Amateur Championship

Professional wins (8)

Challenge Tour wins (8)

*Note: The 2002 Golf Challenge was shortened to 54 holes due to rain.
1Co-sanctioned by the Nordic Golf League

Challenge Tour playoff record (1–1)

Results in major championships

Note: Pyman never played in the U.S. Open or the PGA Championship.

LA = Low amateur
CUT = missed the half-way cut
"T" = tied

Team appearances
Amateur
Jacques Léglise Trophy (representing Great Britain & Ireland): 1991 (winners)
Walker Cup (representing Great Britain & Ireland): 1993
European Amateur Team Championship (representing England): 1993

See also
2005 European Tour Qualifying School graduates
2007 Challenge Tour graduates
List of golfers with most Challenge Tour wins

External links

English male golfers
European Tour golfers
People from Whitby
Sportspeople from Leeds
1973 births
Living people